Oliveira do Mondego e Travanca do Mondego is a civil parish in the municipality of Penacova, Portugal. It was formed in 2013 by the merger of the former parishes Oliveira do Mondego and Travanca do Mondego. The population in 2011 was 1,079, in an area of 22.58 km².

References

Freguesias of Penacova